This is a list of notable contemporary classical violinists.

For the names of notable violinists of all classical music eras see List of classical violinists.

Classical violinists

A
 Rochelle Abramson
 Irene Abrigo (born 1988)
 Salvatore Accardo (born 1941)
 Diana Adamyan (born 2000)
 Ayke Agus (born 1949)
 Ruben Aharonyan (born 1947)
 Sanford Allen (born 1939)
 Levon Ambartsumian (born 1955)
 Pierre Amoyal (born 1949)
 Božena Angelova (born 1981)
 Adele Anthony (born 1970)
 Gilles Apap (born 1963)
 Irvine Arditti (born 1953)
 Cecylia Arzewski (born 1948)
 Shmuel Ashkenasi (born 1941)
 Christina Åstrand (born 1969)
 Kinga Augustyn
 Daniel Austrich (born 1984)
 Felix Ayo (born 1933)

B
 Alena Baeva (born 1985)
 Jenny Oaks Baker (born 1975)
 Kristine Balanas (born 1990)
 Volodja Balžalorsky (born 1956)
 Kristóf Baráti (born 1979)
 William Barbini (born 1947)
 Pedro Barreto (born 1991)
 Lisa Batiashvili (born 1979)
 Elise Båtnes (born 1971)
 Martin Beaver (born 1967)
 Tanja Becker-Bender (born 1978)
 Corina Belcea (born 1975)
 Boris Belkin (born 1948)
 Joshua Bell (born 1967)
 Noah Bendix-Balgley (born 1984)
 Nicola Benedetti (born 1987)
 Yehonatan Berick (born 1968)
 Klara Berkovich (born 1928)
 Dmitri Berlinsky (born 1968)
 Pavel Berman (born 1970)
 Andrew Bernardi (born 1965)
 Oleg Bezuglov (born 1984)
 Mikhail Bezverkhny (born 1947)
 Ida Bieler (born 1950)
 Lea Birringer (born 1986)
 Marat Bisengaliev (born 1962)
 Kolja Blacher (born 1963)
 Dejan Bogdanović
 Nikita Boriso-Glebsky (born 1985)
 Benjamin Bowman (born 1979)
 Guy Braunstein (born 1971)
 Linda Brava (born 1970)
 Vadim Brodski (born 1950)
 Zakhar Bron (born 1947)
 Bui Cong Duy (born 1981)
 Oliver Butterworth

C
 Akim Camara (born 2000)
 Caroline Campbell (born 1979)
 Robert Canetti (born 1948)
 Roberto Cani (born 1967)
 Stuart Canin (born 1926)
 Marie Cantagrill (born 1979)
 Renaud Capuçon (born 1976)
 Andrés Cárdenes (born 1957)
 Giuliano Carmignola (born 1951)
 Jonathan Carney (born 1963)
 Zachary Carrettin (born 1972)
 Charles Martin Castleman (born 1941)
 David Cerone (born 1941)
 Corey Cerovsek (born 1972)
 David Chan
 Lynn Chang (born 1953)
 Sarah Chang (born 1980)
 Corinne Chapelle (born 1976)
 Stephanie Chase (born 1957)
 Anastasia Chebotareva (born 1972)
 Eddy Chen (born 1993)
 Jiafeng Chen (born 1987)
 Ray Chen (born 1989)
 Robert Chen (born 1969)
 Stella Chen (born 1992)
 Jennifer Choi (born 1974)
 Nikki Chooi (born 1989)
 Timothy Chooi (born 1993)
 Chloe Chua (born 2007)
 Ana Chumachenco (born 1945)
 Kyung-wha Chung (born 1948)
 Fanny Clamagirand (born 1984)
 Jeremy Cushman (born 1990)

D
 Alexandre Da Costa
 John Dalley (born 1935)
 Carlos Damas (born 1973)
 Robert Davidovici (born 1946)
 Beverley Davison
 Andrew Dawes  (born 1940)
 Brett Deubner (born 1968)
 Lindsay Deutsch (born 1984)
 Alma Deutscher (born 2005)
 Glenn Dicterow (born 1948)
 Sergei Dogadin (born 1988)
 Angèle Dubeau (born 1962)
 Augustin Dumay (born 1949)

E
 Veronika Eberle (born 1988)
 Renate Eggebrecht (born 1944)
 James Ehnes (born 1976)
 Ayla Erduran (born 1934)
 Vesko Eschkenazy (born 1970)
 Ralph Evans (born 1953)

F
 Luca Fanfoni (born 1964)
 Ralph Farris (born 1970)
 Isabelle Faust (born 1972)
 Maxim Fedotov (born 1961)
 Liza Ferschtman (born 1979)
 Julia Fischer (born 1983)
 Annar Follesø (born 1972)
 Cyrus Forough
 Vilde Frang (born 1986)
 Pamela Frank (born 1967)
 Jennifer Frautschi (born 1973)
 Miriam Fried (born 1946)
 Rodney Friend (born 1939)
 David Frühwirth (born 1974)

G
 Taras Gabora (born 1932)
 Xiang Gao
 Ilian Gârnet (born 1983)
 David Garrett (born 1980)
 Saschko Gawriloff (born 1929)
 Joseph Genualdi
 Thelma Given (1896–1977)
 Jack Glatzer (born 1939)
 Vadim Gluzman (born 1973)
 Ioana Cristina Goicea (born 1992)
 Malcolm Goldstein (born 1936)
 Gottfried von der Goltz (born 1964)
 Karen Gomyo (born 1982)
 Midori Gotō (born 1971)
 Ryu Goto (born 1988)
 Clio Gould
 Philippe Graffin (born 1964)
 Endre Granat (born 1937)
 Salvatore Greco (born 1964)
 David Grimal (born 1973)
 Tatiana Grindenko (born 1946)
 Ilya Gringolts (born 1982)
 Ilya Grubert (born 1954)
 Igor Gruppman (born 1956)
 Vijay Gupta (born 1987)

H
 Augustin Hadelich (born 1984)
 Viviane Hagner (born 1977)
 Hilary Hahn (born 1979)
 Kelly Hall-Tompkins
 Ben Hancox
 Chloë Hanslip (born 1987)
 Edward W. Hardy (born 1992)
 Maurice Hasson (born 1934)
 Joji Hattori (born 1969)
 Moné Hattori (born 1999)
 Ziyu He (born 1999)
 Daniel Heifetz (born 1948)
 Eldbjørg Hemsing (born 1990)
 Ragnhild Hemsing (born 1988)
 Feargus Hetherington (born 1979)
 Philippe Honoré (born 1967)
 Daniel Hope (born 1974)
 Bella Hristova (born 1985)
 Hu Kun (born 1963)
 Hu Nai-yuan (born 1961)
 Frank Huang (born 1978)
 Sirena Huang (born 1994)
 Václav Hudeček (born 1952)
 Fenella Humphreys

I
 Alina Ibragimova (born 1985)
 Aleksey Igudesman (born 1973)
 Petteri Iivonen (born 1987)
 Judith Ingolfsson  (born 1973)
 Liana Isakadze (born 1946)
 Benjamin Izmajlov (born 1974)

J
 Stefan Jackiw (born 1985)
 Janine Jansen (born 1978)
 Dylana Jenson (born 1961)
 Leila Josefowicz (born 1977)

K
 Ilya Kaler (born 1963)
 Kam Ning (born 1975)
 Mayuko Kamio (born 1986)
 Koh Gabriel Kameda (born 1975)
 Mayuko Kamio (born 1986)
 Suna Kan (born 1936)
 Clara-Jumi Kang (born 1987)
 Dong-Suk Kang (born 1954)
 Hyo Kang
 Judy Kang (born 1979)
 Paul Kantor (born 1955)
 Jean-Jacques Kantorow (born 1945)
 Lewis Kaplan (born 1933)
 Mark Kaplan (born 1953)
 Daishin Kashimoto (born 1979)
 Ani Kavafian (born 1948)
 Ida Kavafian (born 1952)
 Leonidas Kavakos (born 1967)
 Tamaki Kawakubo (born 1979)
 Yōsuke Kawasaki (born 1977)
 Gaik Kazazian (born 1982)
 Barnabás Kelemen (born 1978)
 András Keller (born 1960)
 Nigel Kennedy (born 1956)
 Alexander Kerr (born 1970)
 Sergey Khachatryan (born 1985)
 Nadir Khashimov (born 1990)
 Olga Kholodnaya (born 1987)
 Benny Kim (born 1962)
 Bomsori Kim (born 1989)
 Kim Chee-yun (born 1970)
 Chin Kim (born 1957)
 David Kim (born 1963)
 Dennis Kim (born 1975)
 Kim Kyung-Jun (born 1987)
 Soovin Kim (born 1976)
 Mari Kimura (born 1962)
 Rudolf Koelman (born 1959)
 Pavel Kogan (born 1952)
 Jennifer Koh (born 1976)
 Katalin Kokas (born 1978)
 Rachel Kolly d'Alba (born 1981)
 Patricia Kopatchinskaja (born 1977)
 Mikhail Kopelman (born 1947)
 Laurent Korcia (born 1964)
 Henning Kraggerud (born 1973)
 Anna Katharina Kränzlein (born 1980)
 Julia Krasko (born 1971)
 Gidon Kremer (born 1948)
 Sergei Krylov (born 1970)
 Oleh Krysa (born 1942)
 Erzhan Kulibaev
 Konstanty Andrzej Kulka (born 1947)
 Boris Kuschnir (born 1948)
 Yevgeny Kutik (born 1985)
 Pekka Kuusisto (born 1976)

L
 Vladimir Landsman (born 1941)
 Jaime Laredo (born 1941)
 Tessa Lark (born 1989)
 Susanne Lautenbacher (born 1932)
 Anna Lee (born 1995)
 Christel Lee (born 1990)
 Ga-Yeon Lee (born 1992)
 Shannon Lee (born 1992)
 Jozsef Lendvay (born 1974)
 Kerson Leong (born 1997)
 Luz Leskowitz (born 1943)
 Gabrielle Lester
 Christian Li (born 2007)
 Jack Liebeck (born 1980)
 Lim Ji-young (born 1995)
 Cho-liang Lin (born 1960)
 Joseph Lin (born 1978)
 Richard Lin (born 1991)
 Jessica Linnebach (born 1983)
 Robert Lipsett (born 1947)
 Tasmin Little (born 1965)
 Yang Liu (born 1976)
 Daniel Lozakovich (born 2001)
 Lü Siqing (born 1969)
 Barbara Luisi
 Cora Venus Lunny (born 1981)

M
 Cristian Măcelaru (born 1980) 
 Nikolay Madoyan (born 1973)
 Manoj George (born 1971)
 Igor Malinovsky (born 1977)
 Sergey Malov (born 1983)
 Antonello Manacorda (born 1970)
 Catherine Manoukian (born 1981)
 Catya Maré (violinist, songwriter and music producer)
 Yannos Margaziotis (born 1967)
 Albert Markov (born 1933)
 Alexander Markov (born 1963)
 Edvin Marton (born 1974)
 Gwendolyn Masin (born 1977)
Bohuslav Matoušek (born 1949)
 Robert McDuffie (born 1958 estimated,)
 Anne Akiko Meyers (born 1970)
 Franco Mezzena (born 1953)
 Lucia Micarelli (born 1983)
 Geoffrey Michaels (born 1944)
 Stoika Milanova (born 1945)
 Vanya Milanova (born 1954)
 Stefan Milenković (born 1977)
 Shlomo Mintz (born 1957)
 Madeleine Mitchell
 Leticia Moreno (born 1985)
 Amy Schwartz Moretti (born 1975)
 Bijan Mortazavi (born 1957)
 Viktoria Mullova (born 1959)
 Aubrey Murphy
 Tai Murray (born 1982)
 Anne-Sophie Mutter (born 1963)

N
 Stephen Nachmanovitch (born 1950)
 Florin Niculescu (born 1967)
 Gordan Nikolitch (born 1968)
 Ning Feng (born 1982)
 Ayano Ninomiya (born 1979)
 Domenico Nordio (born 1971)

O
 Sarah Oates (born 1976)
 Elmar Oliveira (born 1950)
 Peter Oundjian (born 1955)
 Igor Ozim (born 1931)

P
 Ji-hae Park (born 1985)
 Mariusz Patyra (born 1977)
 György Pauk (born 1936)
 Edith Peinemann (born 1937)
 Adela Peña
 Itzhak Perlman (born 1945)
 Mark Peskanov (born 1958)
 Ioana Petcu-Colan (born 1978)
 Günter Pichler (born 1940)
 Igor Pikayzen (born 1987)
 Jennifer Pike (born 1989)
 Rachel Barton Pine (born 1974)
 Elizabeth Pitcairn (born 1973)
 Ivan Pochekin (born 1987)
 Alina Pogostkina (born 1983)
 Kermit Poling (born 1960)
 Rachel Lee Priday (born 1988)
 Liviu Prunaru (born 1969)

Q
 Philippe Quint (born 1974)

R
 Julian Rachlin (born 1974)
 Nemanja Radulović (born 1985)
 Itzhak Rashkovsky (born 1955)
 Henry Raudales
 Kenneth Renshaw (born 1993)
 Vadim Repin (born 1971)
 Yury Revich (born 1991)
 Gerardo Ribeiro (born 1950)
 André Rieu (born 1949)
 Guido Rimonda (born 1969)
 Shahrdad Rohani (born 1954)
 Svetlin Roussev
 Mary Rowell
 Yaakov Rubinstein (born 1968)

S
 Jorge Saade (born 1964)
 Kaija Saarikettu (born 1957)
 Nikolai Sachenko (born 1977)
 Dilshad Said (born 1958)
 Lara St. John (born 1971)
 Scott St. John (born 1969)
 Julia Sakharova (born 1979)
 Nadja Salerno-Sonnenberg (born 1961)
 Stephanie Sant'Ambrogio (born 1960)
 Eugene Sârbu (born 1950)
 Giora Schmidt (born 1983)
 Rainer Schmidt (born 1964)
 Eduard Schmieder (born 1948)
 Ani Schnarch (born 1957)
 Lynnette Seah (born 1957)
 Ilja Sekler (born 1971)
 Gil Shaham (born 1971)
 Hagai Shaham (born 1966)
 Hyun Su Shin (born 1987)
 Sayaka Shoji (born 1983)
 Charlie Siem (born 1986)
 Siow Lee Chin (born 1966)
 Alexander Sitkovetsky (born 1983)
 Dmitry Sitkovetsky (born 1954)
 Baiba Skride (born 1981)
 Alicja Smietana (born 1983)
 Valeriy Sokolov (born 1986)
 Sue Son (born 1985)
 Josef Špaček (born 1986)
 Vladimir Spivakov (born 1944)
 Daniel Stabrawa (born 1955)
 Sergei Stadler (born 1962)
 Judith Stapf (born 1997)
 Steven Staryk (born 1932)
 Anton Steck (born 1965)
 Vesna Stefanovich-Gruppman
 Arabella Steinbacher (born 1981)
 Arnold Steinhardt (born 1937)
 Lya Stern (born 1950)
 Axel Strauss (born 1974)
 Marius Stravinsky (born 1979)
 Akiko Suwanai (born 1972)
 Airi Suzuki (born 1989)
 Martynas Švėgžda von Bekker (born 1967)
 Vilmos Szabadi (born 1959)
 Antal Szalai   (born 1981)
 Agata Szymczewska (born 1985)

T
 Kyoko Takezawa (born 1966)
 Ilkka Talvi (born 1948)
 Peter Tanfield (born 1961)
 Veriko Tchumburidze (born 1996)
 Arve Tellefsen (born 1936)
 Ryo Terakado (born 1961)
 Christian Tetzlaff (born 1966)
 Gwen Thompson (born 1947)
 Olivier Thouin
 Hugo Ticciati (born 1980)
 Anna Tifu (born 1986)
 Diana Tishchenko (born 1990)
 Emmanuel Tjeknavorian (born 1995)
 Richard Tognetti (born 1965)
 Alexandru Tomescu (born 1976)
 Viktor Tretiakov (born 1946)
 Lana Trotovšek (born 1983)
 Kirill Troussov (born 1982)
 Yu-Chien Tseng (born 1994)

U
 Uto Ughi (born 1944)
 Jourdan Urbach (born 1991)

V
 Elina Vähälä (born 1975)
 Almita Vamos (born 1938)
 Roland Vamos (born 1930)
 Vanessa-Mae (born 1978)
 Satu Vänskä (born 1979)
 Vasko Vassilev (born 1970)
 Maxim Vengerov (born 1974)
 Emmy Verhey (born 1949)
 Zino Vinnikov (born 1943)
 Milan Vitek (born 1938)

W
 Stephen Waarts (born 1996)
 Jean-Pierre Wallez (born 1939)
 Donald Weilerstein (born 1940)
 Antje Weithaas (born 1966)
 Rudolf Werthen (born 1946)
 Noa Wildschut (born 2001)
 Ross Monroe Winter (born 1981)
 Jasper Wood (born 1974)
 Bartosz Woroch (born 1984)

Y
 Brett Yang (born 1992)
 Charles Yang (born 1988)
 In Mo Yang (born 1995)
 Tianwa Yang (born 1987)
 Yuval Yaron (born 1953)
 Esther Yoo (born 1994)
 Scott Yoo (born 1971)
 Soyoung Yoon (born 1984)
 Diana Yukawa (born 1985)

Z
 Antal Zalai (born 1981)
 Thomas Zehetmair (born 1961)
 Ivan Ženatý (born 1962)
 Simone Zgraggen (born 1975)
 Jay Zhong (born 1973)
 Nancy Zhou (born 1993)
 Kevin Zhu (born 2000)
 Leia Zhu (born 2006)
 Frank Peter Zimmermann (born 1965)
 Nikolaj Znaider (born 1975)
 Pinchas Zukerman (born 1948)
 Jaap van Zweden (born 1960)

Baroque violinists 

 Chiara Banchini (born 1946) (also conducts)
 Fabio Biondi (born 1961) (also conducts)
 Giuliano Carmignola (born 1951)
 Lucy van Dael (born 1946)
 Isabelle Faust (born 1972) (performs principally on the modern violin)
 Enrico Gatti (born 1955)
 Reinhard Goebel (born 1952) (also conducts)
 Gottfried von der Goltz (born 1964) (also conducts)
 Ilya Gringolts (born 1982) (performs principally on the modern violin)
 Thomas Hengelbrock (born 1958) (primarily known for conducting)
 John Holloway (born 1948)
 Monica Huggett (born 1953) (also conducts)
 Alina Ibragimova (performs principally on the modern violin)
 Sigiswald Kuijken (born 1944) (also conducts)
 Andrew Manze (born 1965) (also conducts)
 Eduard Melkus (born 1928)
 Viktoria Mullova (born 1959) (performs principally on the modern violin)
 Petra Müllejans (born 1959)
 Ioana Petcu-Colan (born 1978)
 Rachel Barton Pine (born 1974) (performs principally on the modern violin)
 Rachel Podger (born 1968)
 Hélène Schmitt
 Simon Standage (born 1941)
 Elizabeth Wallfisch (born 1952) (also conducts)

References

External links
 Legendary Violinists (a public arts website)
 Famous Violinists of To-day and Yesterday by Henry C. Lahee, an 1889 publication at Project Gutenberg
 Violinists and Violists on the Web Alphabetical listings of web pages on string players, past and present.

Contemporary classical